Ronald M. Brill is a former American retail executive and is a co-founder of the Home Depot. He worked with Arthur Blank and Bernard Marcus at Handy Dan Home Improvement and was fired from that company at the same time they were. Brill was Home Depot's first official employee. He worked with Home Depot for over 20 years, serving as the company's Chief Administration Officer from 1995-2000. 

Brill attended Fairleigh Dickinson University

.

Brill was a Director for Circuit City Stores Inc. as well as Pharmaca Integrative Pharmacy.

Ron Brill was honored by the community at the MJCCA’s Harry Maziar Golf Classic, June 20, 2011.

References

External links
Forbes Magazine Biography

Businesspeople from Atlanta
Living people
Year of birth missing (living people)
Fairleigh Dickinson University alumni
The Home Depot people